Shanxi Xing Rui Flame is a professional women's basketball club located in Taiyuan, Shanxi, China, playing in the Women's Chinese Basketball Association (WCBA). It is also known by its sponsor's name Zhuyeqing. Led by WNBA star Maya Moore, the club won 3 consecutive WCBA championships from 2013 to 2015.

Season-by-season records

Current roster

Notable former players

 Ebony Hoffman (2012)
 Maya Moore (2012–16)
 Penny Taylor (2015)
 Jewell Loyd (2016)
 Tamera Young (2016–17)
 Jonquel Jones (2017–18)
 Jung Sun-min (2012–13)
 Yuko Oga (2013–14)
 Pan Tzu-yin (2014–16)
 Wen Chi (2017–18)
 Zhang Wei (2012–14)
 Ma Xueya (2012–16, 2017–18)
 Zhang Yu (2013–15)
 Guan Xin (2013–17)
 Ji Yanyan (2014–15)
 Huang Hongpin (2014–17)

References

 
Sport in Shanxi